The Indiana Speed was a football team that played in the National Conference of the Women's Professional Football League, and later in the National Concerence of the Women's Football Alliance.

Season results

|-
| colspan="6" align="center" | Indiana Speed (WPFL)
|-
|2002 || 3 || 5 || 0 || 3rd National || –
|-
|2003 || 6 || 4 || 0 || 2nd American North || –
|-
|2004 || 3 || 7 || 0 || 4th National North || –
|-
|2005 || 7 || 3 || 0 || 2nd National || Lost National Conference Qualifier (Minnesota)
|-
|2006 || 7 || 1 || 0 || 1st National North || Lost National Conference Qualifier (Wisconsin)
|-
|2007 || 4 || 4 || 0 || 1st National North || Lost National Conference Qualifier (Wisconsin)
|-
|2008 || colspan="6" rowspan="1" align="center" | Did Not Play
|-
| colspan="6" align="center" | Indiana Speed (WFA)
|-
|2009 || 6 || 2 || 0 || 2nd National Central || Lost National Conference Semifinal (Philadelphia)
|-
|2010 || 5 || 3 || 0 || 2nd National Central || –
|-
!Totals || 41 || 33 || 0
|colspan="2"| (including playoffs)

Season schedules

2009

2010

References

External links
 Indiana Speed official website

Women's Spring Football League teams
Speed
American football teams in Indiana
American football teams established in 2002
American football teams disestablished in 2010
2002 establishments in Indiana
2010 disestablishments in Indiana
Women's sports in Indiana